WGUF (98.9 MHz) is a commercial FM radio station licensed to Marco, Florida,  and broadcasting to the Naples area of Florida's Gulf Coast.  It airs a talk radio format and is owned by Renda Broadcasting.  The station is known as Naples' FM Talk.

WGUF has an effective radiated power (ERP) of 6,000 watts.  The transmitter is off the Tamiami Trail (U.S. Route 41) near Auto Village Road in Lely Resort, Florida.

Programming
Weekdays begin with a local news and information show hosted by Dave Elliott.  The rest of the weekday schedule largely comes from nationally syndicated conservative talk shows:  Mike Gallagher, Dennis Prager, Ben Shapiro, Michael Knowles, Joe Pags, Jim Bohannon, Red Eye Radio and This Morning, America's First News with Gordon Deal.

Weekends feature shows on money, health and real estate, plus repeats of weekday programs.  Most hours begin with Townhall News.

History
WGUF first signed on the air in 1990.  It was originally on 92.7 MHz, moving to its current dial position a few years later.  It was owned by Rowland Gulf Broadcasting, Inc., with Marshall Rowland Sr. as the president and Stephen Rowland as the general manager.  The format was easy listening music.  WGUF was an affiliate of the ABC Entertainment Network.

In 1997, it was acquired by Renda Broadcasting in a $2 million deal.  Renda later switched the station to a talk radio format.

References

External links

GUF
Renda Broadcasting radio stations